Hegyhátsál TV Tower is a 117-meter tall transmission tower near Hegyhátsál at Hungary at 46°57'21N and 16°39'08E. Hegyhátsál TV tower is a tower is one
of the few partially guyed towers as it consists of a concrete tower as basement with a guyed mast on its top. 
Hegyhátsál TV Tower is not only used for FM- and TV-broadcasting, it carries also instruments for measuring the
concentration of carbon dioxide. Therefore, it carries corresponding devices 10, 48, 82 and 115 metres above ground.
At the uppermost measuring sites also instruments for measuring wind speed, wind direction, temperature and air humidity are mounted on a 4.4 metre long arm.

Transmitted programmes

FM

TV

External links
 https://web.archive.org/web/20061126102033/http://www.aerocarb.cnrs-gif.fr/sites/elu/hegyhatsal/hegyhatsal.html
 http://nimbus.elte.hu/hhs/
 http://www.dxpg.at/senderfotos/ungarn/vasvar.htm

Radio masts and towers in Hungary
Towers in Hungary
Buildings and structures in Vas County